Psalm 143 is the 143rd psalm of the biblical Book of Psalms in the Masoretic and modern numbering, part of the final Davidic collection of psalms, comprising Psalms 138 to 145, which are specifically attributed to David in their opening verses. It is one of the seven Penitential Psalms. The New King James Version calls it "An Earnest Appeal for Guidance and Deliverance".

In the slightly different numbering system used in the Greek Septuagint version of the Bible and in the Latin Vulgate/Vulgata Clementina, this psalm is Psalm 142.

The psalm has two equal sections, verses 1-6 and 7-12, separated by a Selah.

Theme 
One of the Penitential Psalms, it is a prayer to be delivered from the psalmist's enemies. It takes the form of a King's prayer for victory and peace. According to Augustine of Hippo this psalm was likely written during the period of the rebellion of David's son Absalom.

Text

Hebrew Bible version 
The following is the Hebrew text of Psalm 143:

Verse 11
Revive me, O Lord, for Your name’s sake!For Your righteousness’ sake bring my soul out of trouble.Father Stavros Akrotirianakis points out that in most English translations, verse 11 reads "in your righteousness, bring me out of trouble", whereas the reading in Greek is "in your righteousness bring out of trouble my soul". This then affects the reading of verse 12. "This verse asks God specifically to destroy those who afflict our souls, not our lives." Alexander Kirkpatrick notes that the verbs "revive" and "bring" should be read as future statements based on confidence in God, rather than as imperatives.

Uses
Jewish
Verse 2 is found in the repetition of the Amidah during Rosh Hashanah.

New Testament
Verse 2b is quoted in Romans .

Catholic Church
In the Benedictine tradition, Benedict of Nursia selected Psalm 142 (143) to be sung on Saturdays at the Office for Lauds (Chapter XIII) after Psalm 51. A number of monasteries still preserve this tradition.

Psalm 143 is recited on the fourth Thursday of the four weekly cycle of liturgical prayers at Lauds (Morning Prayer) in the Liturgy of the Hours, and every Tuesday night at compline (Night Prayer).

Orthodox Church
This psalm is read at every Orthros, Paraklesis, Salutations to the Virgin Mary, and Holy Unction service.

 Musical Settings 
Alan Hovhaness set verses 1 and 5 in his 1936 work Hear my prayer, O Lord''.

References

External links

  in Hebrew and English – Mechon-mamre
  King James Bible – Wikisource

143
Works attributed to David